Jutson is a surname. Notable people with the surname include:

Andrea Jutson, New Zealand writer
John Thomas Jutson (1874–1959), Australian geologist and lawyer